Zidartsi is a village in Southern Bulgaria. The village is located in Pernik Municipality, Pernik Province. Аccording to the numbers provided by the 2020 Bulgarian census, Zidartsi currently has a population of 87 people with a permanent address registration in the settlement.

Geography 
Zidartsi village is located in Pernik Municipality and lies 6 kilometers away from the town Batanovtsi and 6 kilometers away from the larger village Yardzhilovtsi. The village is located in the geographical area Graovo.

The first written record of the village dates back to 1606 in Ottoman records. The village was built over the remains of an abandoned Ottoman farm. According to these records in 1878 the village consisted of 7 houses.

Currently it is divided into 3 small neighborhoods, upper neighborhood (24 houses), Middle (7 houses), and lower (15 houses).

Infrastructure 
There is a supermarket in the village, while the nearest medical help is located at the nearest municipality. There is a new temple “Vsi Sveti” and a football club alongside a stadium.

The community hall and library “Vasil Levski” was built in 1975.

Ethnicity 
According to the Bulgarian population census in 2011.

References 

Villages in Pernik Province